The Sussex Spaniel is a breed of dog native to Sussex in southern England. It is a low, compact spaniel and is as old a breed as and similar in appearance to the Clumber Spaniel. They can be slow-paced, but can have a clownish and energetic temperament. They suffer from health conditions common to spaniels and some large dogs, as well as a specific range of heart conditions and spinal disc herniation.

The Sussex Spaniel was first recorded in 1795 in East and West Sussex, being at Goodwood and Rolvenden for specific hunting conditions. The breed nearly became extinct during the Second World War, but was bred back to sustainable numbers. It is now more popular in the United Kingdom and the United States than any other countries, and is recognised by all major kennel clubs. The breed was one of the first to be recognised by the UK Kennel Club in 1872. Sussex Spaniel Stump won the best in show in 2009 at the 133rd Westminster Kennel Club.

Description

The Sussex Spaniel is a low compact spaniel similar in appearance, but not in colour, to a  Clumber Spaniel.

One of the noticeable features is their golden liver-coloured coat which is unique to the breed. Historically however, there have also been examples of black, black and tan and golden liver and white coloured Sussex Spaniels.  coat is thick (sometimes with a slight wave to it), feathering on the chest, legs and ears and consists of a weather-resistant undercoat with a silky outer coat. The eyes are hazel in colour. The long silky ears are lobe-shaped typical of the Spaniel, and set moderately low. The Sussex is a short, stocky kind of dog.

Temperament
The Sussex Spaniel is a slow-paced, calm breed with somewhat clownish behaviour that normally keeps his energy and enthusiasm in check.  He is always eager to be around people, is excellent around children, and can be quite protective of the family. They make excellent candidates for therapy dog work.  Most Sussex Spaniels are primarily family pets, but they are competent enough to aid a hunter though quite stubborn to train. They tend to have a natural ability to quarter in the field, have excellent noses, and can be used to retrieve, given training. The breed is the only spaniel to howl once a game's scent is picked up.

Health

The breed is generally healthy with an average life span of 12 to 15 years. Hip dysplasia, a genetic malformation of the hip joint, may be a concern but because of the breed's compact nature is not often seriously debilitating. Surveys conducted by the Orthopedic Foundation For Animals showed that 41.5% of Sussex Spaniels were affected by hip dysplasia, and the breed was ranked 9th worst affected out of 157 breeds.

Another common condition is otitis externa (outer ear infections), which is common to a variety of spaniels, as the long floppy ears trap moisture, making them more prone to recurrent infections than dogs with more upright ears. The infections can be caused by a variety of reasons including mites, ear fungi and generally dirt and germs. Treatment is relatively simple and can range from prescribed antibiotics to over-the-counter ear cleaning liquids.

Whelping sometimes presents difficulties and require caesarean section for successful delivery of the puppies. The Sussex Spaniel is considered difficult to breed.

Heart conditions in the Sussex Spaniel can include pulmonary valve stenosis, which is the most common of the congenital heart defects. Essentially, in an animal with this condition, the pulmonary valve is improperly formed which causes the heart to work much faster to pump blood around the body. The final results of this condition can be swelling of fluid in the chambers of the heart, thickening of the heart muscle known as ventricular hypertrophy leading to eventual heart failure.

Patent ductus arteriosus also appears in the breed. It is a condition where a small blood vessel connecting two major arteries does not close following birth. It can cause complications as it is positioned to allow the blood flow to bypass the lungs. It also appears in American Staffordshire Terriers.

A heart condition uncommon to the breed is tetralogy of Fallot, which is more common in the Keeshond and English Bulldog breeds relatively. It is actually a combination of up to four conditions, including the previously mentioned pulmonary valve stenosis, with a secondary condition of right ventricular hypertrophy. The other conditions are ventricular septal defect which is a defect or hole in the wall of the heart between the two ventricles and the aorta which carries the blood from the left to the right side of the heart can be mis-positioned. The effect on the dog depends on the severity of the condition, and can range from a heart murmur through to reduced activity levels to death. Symptoms in puppies are generally a failure to grow and a reduced tolerance for exercise. Active treatment is effective in around 50% of cases.

Intervertebral disc syndrome
Also commonly called spinal disc herniation, this is where the intervertebral disc bulges or ruptures into the vertebral canal where the spinal cord resides. When the cord is compressed, the dog can experience symptoms ranging in scope from mild back or neck pain to paralysis of limbs, loss of sensation, and loss of bladder or bowel control. It is most commonly seen in the mid-back area, but can occur anywhere along the spine. Mild cases that do not result in paralysis can be treated medically by confining the animal in a crate to restrict movement to a minimum for several weeks, which can be accompanied by pain medication. Surgery can restore sensation to a dog's legs following paralysis but the success rate depends on how severe the herniation was.

History

The Sussex is a native breed to the county, known to be bred at Goodwood, West Sussex in 1792 and by Augustus Elliot Fuller of Rose Hill (now known as Brightling Park, Brightling in East Sussex, England. The Sussex is a breed of gun dog able to work in districts where the terrain is rough and the undergrowth very dense where a spaniel was needed which could give tongue or to alert the hunter on his quarry.  The Sussex as a breed is older than the liver and white Norfolk Spaniel (now extinct), the Field Spaniel, and English Springer Spaniels. The Sussex was bred specifically to inherit the barking ability ( giving tongue) that was not common in most Spaniel breeds.

The Sussex Spaniel was one of the first to be registered by the UK Kennel club when it formed in 1872 and was one of the first ten breeds admitted into the stud book by the American Kennel Club in 1884, but lost what little popularity it had achieved in the 1940s. During World War II, breeding was discouraged but  the Sussex saved from extinction by English breeder Joy Freer. All modern Sussex Spaniels are descended from the dogs she saved. In 1947, only ten Sussex Spaniels were registered in the English Kennel Club.

In 2004 the breed was identified as a vulnerable native breed by Kennel Club of Great Britain which are described as having annual registration figures of less than 300 per year. In 2008, only 56 puppies were registered.

In 2009 a Sussex Spaniel named "Clussexx Three D Grinchy Glee," call name "Stump," won best in show at the 133rd Westminster Kennel Club Dog Show. At 10 years old, Stump is the oldest dog to win this title.

The breed is more popular in the United Kingdom and the United States than any other countries. It is recognised by the Continental Kennel Club, Fédération Cynologique Internationale, American Kennel Club, Kennel Club of Great Britain, Canadian Kennel Club, National Kennel Club, New Zealand Kennel Club, and the American Canine Registry.

References

External links

Sussex Spaniel Association
Sussex Spaniel Club of America

FCI breeds
Dog breeds originating in England
Spaniels
Gundogs
Rare dog breeds
Vulnerable Native Breeds